The Organisation of Islamic Cooperation founded in 1969 has 57 members, 56 of which are also member states of the United Nations, with 48 countries being Muslim majority countries. Some member countries, especially in West Africa and South America, are – though with large Muslim populations – not necessarily Muslim majority countries. A few countries with significant Muslim populations, such as Russia and Thailand, sit as Observer States.

The collective population of OIC member states is over 2 billion as of 2022.

Member states

Observer states

Withdrawn

Observer organisations and communities

Observer Islamic institutions

Observer international organisations

Membership attempts
  - Requested observer status in 2010.
  - Requested observer status in 2011.
  - Requested full membership in 2002.
  - Requested observer status in 2012.
  - Requested observer status in 2008 and full membership in 2011.
  - India, where Muslims are a minority had shown an interest in joining the OIC as a member state at the time of its formation. However, it was opposed by Pakistan. India has never made a formal application to join OIC as an observer or as a member state. While India's potential candidacy is supported by some OIC members, Pakistan's strong opposition and threat to boycott the OIC has effectively led to India's inclusion in the OIC being blocked. The Pakistan Foreign Office has argued that India's inclusion in OIC would violate the rules of the OIC, which require that an aspirant state should not have an ongoing conflict with a member state.
  - Requested full membership in 2011.
  - Requested full membership in November 2016.
  - Requested full membership in 2002.
  - Requested observer status in 2008.
  - Requested observer status in 2008.  The Philippine government has made attempts to join the OIC, but this is opposed by the Moro National Liberation Front, an OIC observer located in the Philippines. The MNLF claims that Philippine membership is unnecessary. In 2009, the country's bid received stronger support and has been advocated by Indonesia, Iran, Malaysia, and the United Arab Emirates, among others. In 2019, one of the leaders of the MNLF, Nir Misuari, was appointed as a special envoy to the organization.
  - Requested observer status in 2008.
  - Requested observer status in 2002.
  - Requested observer status in 2008.

Notes

References

 
Organisation of Islamic Cooperation